Alvaro Linares Silva (born March 30, 1984), known as Álvaro Silva, is a professional footballer who plays as a centre-back for Segunda División RFEF club Antequera and the Philippines national team.

He played for clubs in Spain, Romania, Azerbaijan, Kuwait, South Korea, Vietnam, Malaysia, Philippines and Thailand during his senior career, notably amassing Segunda División totals of 165 matches and two goals at the service of Málaga B, Málaga, Xerez (two spells) and Cádiz.

Born in Spain, Silva has been representing the Philippines since 2014, for whom he is eligible through his paternal grandmother.

Club career
Silva was born in Andújar, Jaén. After one loan, he made his senior debut with Atlético Malagueño, appearing in two second division seasons and being relegated in the latter. His first contact with the first team came in 2006–07, also in the second level (33 games, one goal).

In 2008–09, Silva was loaned by Málaga for a second time, to another Andalusian side, Xerez CD, appearing relatively as they achieved a first-ever La Liga promotion. On 16 July 2009 he returned to Málaga, being immediately released and joining neighbors Cádiz CF in the second level for three years. A starter through most of the campaign, he suffered relegation this time.

Silva returned to division two and Xerez in the summer of 2011. After only one league appearance in the first half of the season, however, he moved abroad and penned a six-month contract with Liga I club FC Petrolul Ploiești.

In January 2013, Silva signed an 18-month deal with Khazar Lankaran FK of the Azerbaijan Premier League. He won his second piece of silverware on 23 October of that year, featuring against Neftchi Baku PFK in the Azerbaijan Supercup.

After his stint in Azerbaijan, Silva turned down offers from clubs in Israel, Qatar and Spain which included Marbella FC, in favor of Kuwaiti Premier League's Qadsia SC. On 30 August 2016, he left Daejeon Citizen FC and began training with Indonesian club Arema Cronus F.C. who was poised to sign him pending a successful medical, but eventually nothing came of it.

Silva joined V.League 1 side Hanoi FC on 21 December 2016, for one year.

International career
In early 2014, Silva started work on getting his Filipino passport as his paternal grandmother was Filipino. so he would be eligible to play for the Philippines national team. By mid-June, he arrived in Manila to further process his documents.

Silva made his international debut on October 31, 2014, coming on as a substitute in a 3–0 friendly win against Nepal.

Personal life
Silva was born to Spanish parents – his father being of Filipino descent– and traces his Filipino roots to Cavite and Iloilo. Silva belongs to a family of footballers, his younger brother Enrique, played for Malaga B, his cousin Kike Linares – who is also a Philippines international and Nacho Linares, who currently plays for the U19 team of Vázquez Cultural.

Club statistics

Honours
Xerez
Segunda División: 2008–09

Khazar
Azerbaijan Supercup: 2013
Azerbaijan Cup runner-up: 2012–13

Al-Qadsia
Kuwait Super Cup: 2014
AFC Cup: 2014

BG Pathum United
 Thai League 1: 2020–21

Individual
AFF Championship Best Eleven: 2018

References

External links
Stats and bio at Cadistas1910 

1984 births
Living people
People from Andújar
Sportspeople from the Province of Jaén (Spain)
Spanish people of Filipino descent
Spanish sportspeople of Asian descent
Citizens of the Philippines through descent
Filipino people of Spanish descent
Sportspeople of Spanish descent
Spanish footballers
Filipino footballers
Footballers from Andalusia
Association football defenders
Segunda División players
Segunda División B players
Atlético Malagueño players
Marbella FC players
Málaga CF players
Xerez CD footballers
Cádiz CF players
Liga I players
FC Petrolul Ploiești players
Azerbaijan Premier League players
Khazar Lankaran FK players
K League 1 players
Daejeon Hana Citizen FC players
V.League 1 players
Hanoi FC players
Malaysia Super League players
Kedah Darul Aman F.C. players
Ceres–Negros F.C. players
Alvaro Silva
Alvaro Silva
Alvaro Silva
Philippines international footballers
2019 AFC Asian Cup players
AFC Cup winning players
Spanish expatriate footballers
Filipino expatriate footballers
Expatriate footballers in Romania
Expatriate footballers in Azerbaijan
Expatriate footballers in Kuwait
Expatriate footballers in South Korea
Expatriate footballers in Vietnam
Expatriate footballers in Malaysia
Expatriate footballers in Thailand
Spanish expatriate sportspeople in Romania
Spanish expatriate sportspeople in Azerbaijan
Spanish expatriate sportspeople in Kuwait
Spanish expatriate sportspeople in Vietnam
Spanish expatriate sportspeople in Thailand
Filipino expatriate sportspeople in Romania
Filipino expatriate sportspeople in Kuwait
Filipino expatriate sportspeople in Thailand
Filipino expatriate sportspeople in Azerbaijan
Filipino expatriate sportspeople in South Korea
Filipino expatriate sportspeople in Vietnam
Filipino expatriate sportspeople in Malaysia
Qadsia SC players
Kuwait Premier League players